Nesopupa quadrasi is a species of very small, air-breathing land snail, a terrestrial pulmonate gastropod mollusk in the family Vertiginidae, the whorl snails. This species is endemic to Guam.

References

Fauna of Guam
Vertiginidae
Taxonomy articles created by Polbot